Air Warning Squadron 14 (AWS-14) was a United States Marine Corps aviation command and control squadron during World War II. The squadron's primary mission was to provide aerial surveillance and early warning of approaching enemy aircraft during amphibious assaults.  Formed in June 1944, the squadron was one of a handful of air warning squadrons that was never able to deploy overseas during the war.  The squadron was decommissioned shortly after the end of the war in November 1945.  To date, no other Marine Corps squadron has carried the lineage and honors of AWS-14 to include the former reserve Marine Air Control Squadron 14 (MACS-14).

Equipment
AN/TTQ-1 – transportable filter and operations center.
2 x SCR-270s – long range early warning radar.
1 x SCR-527 – medium-range early warning radar used for ground-controlled interception (GCI).
3 x SCR-602s – Light-weight early warning radar to be utilized during the initial stages of an amphibious assault.

Mission
Provide early warning of air raids and tactical control of aircraft in defense of assigned area.

History

Organization and training
Air Warning Squadron 14 was commissioned on June 1, 1944 as part of Marine Air Warning Group 1 at Marine Corps Air Station Cherry Point, North Carolina. On July 15, 1944 the majority of the squadron convoyed to Marine Corps Outlying Field Oak Grove in Pollocksville, North Carolina while an SCR-270 crew was sent to Bogue Field.  Air Warning Group 1 maintained its training equipment at the Pollocksville site and each new air warning squadron commissioned rotated through for their first familiarization on the gear. The squadron returned to MCAS Cherry Point on September 10, 1944 and continued training at the station until November.

Congaree and decommissioning
In November 1944 the squadron was transferred to Congaree Army Airfield, South Carolina when the base was made available to Navy and Marine Corps units.  Training was immediately commenced in radar and control center operations and they worked closely with aircraft from Marine Aircraft Group 52 and army aircraft from nearby Chatham Field. During this period the squadron's Air Defense Control Center went by the callsign "Wilson."

On October 8, 1945 the squadron ceased operations at Congaree and began preparing their gear for departure.  On October 26 it moved back to MCAS Cherry Point.  The squadron was decommissioned on November 30, 1945 by the authority of 9th Marine Aircraft Wing order #57-145.

Commanding officers
Capt Edward R. Stainback – June 1, 1944 – November 27, 1944
Capt Robert M. McCormick Jr. – Navember 28, 1944 – March 1, 1945
Capt William E. Hooper March 2, 1945 - March 30, 1945
Capt Robert M. McCormick Jr - March 31, 1945 - October 4, 1945
1stLt J.J. Hengstler - October 5, 1945 - November 30, 1945

Unit awards
A unit citation or commendation is an award bestowed upon an organization for the action cited. Members of the unit who participated in said actions are allowed to wear on their uniforms the awarded unit citation. What follows is an incomplete list of the awards AWS-14 has been presented with:

See also
 Aviation combat element
 United States Marine Corps Aviation
 List of United States Marine Corps aviation support units

Citations

References

Bibliography
 

Radar
Inactive units of the United States Marine Corps
Military units and formations established in 1944